Alejandro Daniel Silva González (born 4 September 1989) is a Uruguayan footballer who plays as a right midfielder for Paraguayan Primera División side Club Olimpia.

He is a two-footed player with the ability to defend, run with the ball, set up goals and score as well.

On 19 July 2015, Paraguayan newspaper ExtraPRESS named Silva one of the most expensive player in Paraguay.

Early life
In his adolescence, Silva believed that football was not for him and opted to work. He worked as pizza delivery boy and in some more jobs. But one day, playing a neighborhood amateur championship, he was seen by Mario Icardo, director of Boston River, which saw on him many conditions and decided to take him to the club. After making the pre-season, the manager at exercise decided that it would not consider him for the team.

Taking advantage that he was already physically fit, and with the support of his family, Silva went to try his luck at Centro Atlético Fénix where he was seen by Rosario Martínez who decided to call him to play for the reserve team.

Career
Silva made his professional debut for Fénix on 23 January 2013 against River Plate playing the whole match. He played with the club the Copa Sudamericana being eliminated in first stage by the subsequent champions Universidad de Chile.

In July 2012, Silva signed a new deal with Paraguayan side Club Olimpia. In February 2014, Silva moved to Argentina and signed with Lanús. In August 2014 he moved back to Peñarol on loan from Lanús.

Career statistics

Honours
Olimpia
Copa Libertadores runner-up: 2013

References

External links
 

1989 births
Living people
Uruguayan footballers
Uruguay international footballers
Footballers from Montevideo
Association football defenders
Association football midfielders
Uruguayan Primera División players
Paraguayan Primera División players
Argentine Primera División players
Centro Atlético Fénix players
Club Olimpia footballers
Club Atlético Lanús footballers
Peñarol players
CF Montréal players
Uruguayan expatriate footballers
Uruguayan expatriate sportspeople in Argentina
Uruguayan expatriate sportspeople in Paraguay
Uruguayan expatriate sportspeople in Canada
Expatriate footballers in Argentina
Expatriate footballers in Paraguay
Expatriate soccer players in Canada
Major League Soccer players